Euteleostei, whose members are known as euteleosts, is a clade of bony fishes within Teleostei that evolved some 240 million years ago. It is divided into Protacanthopterygii (including the salmon and dragonfish) and Neoteleostei (including the lanternfish, lizardfish, oarfish, and Acanthopterygii).

The cladogram is based on Near et al. (2012) and Betancur-Rodriguez et al. 2016. They explored the phylogeny and divergence times of every major lineage, analysing the DNA sequences of 9 unlinked genes. They calibrated (set actual values for) branching times in this tree from 36 reliable measurements of absolute time from the fossil record.

References